This is a partial discography of American jazz singer Mel Tormé.

Studio albums

Live albums

Compilations

Chart singles

Contributions
 Born to Laugh at Tornadoes (1983, Geffen) - "Zaz Turned Blue" (with Was (Not Was))
 2:00 AM Paradise Cafe (1984, Arista) - "Big City Blues" (with Barry Manilow)

References

External links

 
 
Vocal jazz discographies
Discographies of American artists